Pănășești is a commune in Strășeni District, Moldova. It is composed of two villages, Ciobanca and Pănășești.

Education
The kindergarten in the village of Pănășești was opened in March 2010, after renovation. This is the 41st kindergarten in the country to be re-opened by the Ministry of Education (Moldova) with the help of the local communities and international partners, Minister Leonid Bujor said at the inauguration.

Notable people
 Elena Robu-Popa

References

Bibliography
 Dinu Poștarencu, Pănășești: File de istorie, Chișinău, 2002,

External links
 Timpul de dimineață, La Pănășești e redeschisă grădinița

Communes of Strășeni District